Orna Datz (born Orna Cohen born 10 May 1964) is an Israeli singer, actress and television presenter.

Biography
Orna Cohen was born in Holon, Israel. At age 17, she was elected "Miss Holon". In 1987 she married the singer Moshe Datz and they became known as the Duo Datz. In 2001 she began to host the fashion tv series Makeover (מהפך) , and in 2006 she began hosting the Israeli version of The Swan. In 2005 and 2006 she presented the Miss Israel Beauty pageant .

20th-century Israeli women singers
Eurovision Song Contest entrants for Israel
Eurovision Song Contest entrants of 1991
Israeli television presenters
Israeli beauty pageant winners
Beauty pageant hosts
1964 births
Living people
Israeli women television presenters